Xenorhina multisica is a species of frog in the family Microhylidae.
It is endemic to West Papua, Indonesia.
Its natural habitats are subtropical or tropical moist montane forests, subtropical or tropical high-altitude grassland, rural gardens, and heavily degraded former forest.

References

Xenorhina
Amphibians of Western New Guinea
Taxonomy articles created by Polbot
Amphibians described in 1989